Herink is a municipality and village in Prague-East District in the Central Bohemian Region of the Czech Republic. It has about 1,000 inhabitants. As of census 2001, Herink had 72 inhabitants and therefore it is one of the fastest-growing municipalities in the country.

Gallery

References

Villages in Prague-East District